Robert Seagren (born October 17, 1946) is a retired American pole vaulter, the 1968 Olympic champion.

A native of Pomona, California, Seagren was one of the world's top pole vaulters in the late 1960s and early 1970s. He won six National AAU and four NCAA titles indoors and outdoors. Indoors he posted eight world bests between 1966 and 1969. He was also the Pan American Games champion in 1967. He set his first world record  in Fresno on May 14, 1966, followed by his world records 1967 in San Diego , 1968 in Echo Summit near South Lake Tahoe  and 1972 in Eugene .

In 1968, Seagren participated in his first Olympic Games in Mexico City. In an exciting contest, he won the gold medal with the top three vaulters, including silver medalist Claus Schiprowski (West Germany) and the bronze medal winner Wolfgang Nordwig (East Germany) reaching the same height .

Four years later, in Munich, he remains best remembered for the Olympic gold medal he didn't get. In the 1972 Summer Olympics, a last-minute ruling barred the new banana-Pole from Olympic competition, forcing some vaulters, including Seagren, to compete with unfamiliar poles. East German Wolfgang Nordwig didn't use a Cata-Pole and won the gold medal, with Seagren coming second.  It was the first time an American had failed to win the Olympic gold medal in the pole vault. In fact, no American would again win a gold medal in the pole vault until Nick Hysong won in 2000.

A 1968 University of Southern California graduate, Seagren took a try at professional track and later he started his career in television and movies as a show host and soap opera actor.

Seagren won the inaugural American Superstars sports competition in 1973 as well as the first World Superstars in 1977, his lone victories in both events. He was able to enjoy the spoils from these competitions because he had become a professional athlete having signed to join the International Track Association (ITA) tour after the 1972 Olympics. On the ITA tour he renewed his very personal antagonistic rivalry with fellow American pole vaulter Steve Smith.

Seagren went on to become an actor, appearing in several movies and television shows, including the controversial sitcom Soap in 1977 in which he played Dennis Phillips, a gay football player in a relationship with Billy Crystal's character Jodie Dallas. He appeared as a guest star in an episode of Charlie's Angels in 1980, called "Toni's Boys" as a detective who worked for a friend of Charlie who was also in the detective business. The episode was a backdoor pilot for a new series but the show wasn't picked up by the network. He was referred to in the episode as an "Olympic Champion" although he played a fictional character. He also guest starred on the tv series Wonder Woman in the episodes called "Stolen Faces" and "The Man Who Could Not Die". Seagren played himself, serving as an LAPD youth camp counselor on the "Camp Two" episode of Adam-12.

Today, he is CEO of International City Racing, which specializes in the development, management, and implementation of road racing, endurance, and fitness events, including the Long Beach International City Marathon. He is also an active supporter of the Commission on Athletics of the California Community Colleges.

He was named to the inaugural class of the Mt. SAC Relays Hall of Fame.  In 1986 he was inducted into the USATF National Track and Field Hall of Fame.

Personal life
From 1970 to 1982, Seagren was married to former teen model, dancer, and co-host of KHJ-TV's The Groovy Show, Kam Nelson. They had a daughter.

References

External links

 See the Eugene record jump  @ 19:20
 
 
 
 

1946 births
Living people
American male pole vaulters
Athletes (track and field) at the 1967 Pan American Games
Athletes (track and field) at the 1968 Summer Olympics
Athletes (track and field) at the 1972 Summer Olympics
Mt. San Antonio College alumni
Sportspeople from Pomona, California
World record setters in athletics (track and field)
USC Trojans men's track and field athletes
Track and field athletes from California
Junior college men's track and field athletes in the United States
Medalists at the 1972 Summer Olympics
Medalists at the 1968 Summer Olympics
Pan American Games gold medalists for the United States
Olympic gold medalists for the United States in track and field
Olympic silver medalists for the United States in track and field
American chief executives
Pan American Games medalists in athletics (track and field)
Universiade medalists in athletics (track and field)
Universiade silver medalists for the United States
Medalists at the 1967 Summer Universiade
Medalists at the 1967 Pan American Games